Wild About Hurry is a 1959 Warner Bros. Merrie Melodies cartoon directed by Chuck Jones. The short was released on October 10, 1959, and stars Wile E. Coyote and the Road Runner.
The title is a pun on the then-popular song, I'm Just Wild About Harry.

Plot
Wile E. Coyote is shown brandishing scissors on top of a high-rise tree branch, ready to cut a rope and drop a rock onto the passing Road Runner. The rock displays the title, and when it falls to the ground and barely misses, the credits are shown in the dust and scrambled by the exhaust of a rocket.
 Coyote rides the rocket, which lets him almost catch Road Runner. 
 An ACME giant elastic rubber band causes a hard faceplant. 
 Coyote tries to smash Road Runner with a rock, but it drops off a cliff with him on it and he must save himself with a "spinning top" run. 
 A hand-built railroad on another cliff, complete with rocket car, produces a crash. 
 Coyote tricks the bird into swallowing iron pellets, then puts a magnet and a hand grenade together with a roller skate. The assembly comes apart and leaves the grenade behind to explode in Coyote's face.
 A bowling ball intended to squash Road Runner pounds Coyote instead. 
 With all the forces of nature against him, Coyote plugs himself into an ACME Indestructo Steel Ball and rolls himself off an escarpment. The ball rolls off course, Coyote inside, and through a tortuous course. The entire sequence repeats as the Road Runner approaches once again, and after Coyote misses him for a second time, the Road Runner holds up a sign that says "HERE WE GO AGAIN", beeps, and then dashes off into the distance as the cartoon irises out.

See also
 Looney Tunes and Merrie Melodies filmography (1950–1959)
 Wile E.'s ACME Amusement Park (in the rocket sled segment)

References

External links
 
 

1959 animated films
1959 short films
1950s Warner Bros. animated short films
Merrie Melodies short films
American animated short films
Short films directed by Chuck Jones
Wile E. Coyote and the Road Runner films
Films scored by Milt Franklyn
Animated films without speech
Films with screenplays by Michael Maltese
Films about Canis
Animated films about mammals
Animated films about birds
American comedy short films